Amerotyphlops trinitatus, known commonly as the Trinidad blindsnake, Trinidad worm snake, and Trinidad burrowing snake, is a harmless blind snake species in the family Typhlopidae. The species is endemic to Trinidad and Tobago. There are no subspecies that are recognized as being valid.

Description

Geographic range
Found mostly on the island of Tobago, A. trinitatus is known from widely scattered locations, and from a single location on the island of Trinidad, which happens to be the type locality. This is described as "Trinidad [County of St. George], ... Arima Road, 3 miles above [north of] Simla [Research Station]".

Habitat

Reproduction
Amerotyphlops trinitatus is oviparous.

References

Further reading
Hedges SB, Marion AB, Lipp KM, Marin J, Vidal N (2014). "A taxonomic framework for typhlopid snakes from the Caribbean and other regions (Reptilia, Squamata)". Caribbean Herpetology (49): 1-61. (Amerotyphlops trinitatus, new combination).
Richmond ND (1965). "A new species of blind snake, Typhlops, from Trinidad". Proc. Biol. Soc. Washington 78: 121-124. (Typhlops trinitatus, new species).

External links

trinitatus
Reptiles of Trinidad and Tobago
Endemic fauna of Trinidad and Tobago
Reptiles described in 1965